Cleland National Park, formerly Cleland Conservation Park, is a protected area located in the Adelaide Hills, South Australia about  south-east of the Adelaide city centre. It conserves a significant area of natural bushland on the Adelaide Hills face, including Mount Lofty Summit and Waterfall Gully.

Formerly a conservation park, Cleland was combined with the bordering Eurilla Conservation Park in November 2021 when it was upgraded to the status of national park. The area includes Cleland Wildlife Park, a major tourist attraction, with the draft plan suggesting that the Wildlife Park will be a part of the new Cleland National Park, but this is open to public consultation until late January 2022.

The park is classified as an IUCN Category II protected area.

History
Cleland Conservation Park was established on 1 January 1945 and classified as Category II protected area in IUCN protected area management categories. The primary objective for Category II is "to protect natural biodiversity along with its underlying ecological structure and supporting environmental processes, and to promote education and recreation".

The conservation park was named for Sir John Burton Cleland (1878-1971), a renowned naturalist, microbiologist, mycologist and ornithologist, and member of the Royal Society of South Australia. After a career in medicine and pathology, Cleland became keenly interested in wildlife conservation.

In November 2017 a concept plan was announced by the Weatherill government to revamp the park, including a hotel and a cable car connection, but the plan was described by critics as "pre-election glitter". The Weatherill government was not returned at the subsequent election in March 2018.

On 26 November 2021 Cleland Conservation Park was combined with Eurilla Conservation Park, which was adjacent to it, and proclaimed a national park.  The area includes the Cleland Wildlife Park precinct, with the draft plan suggesting that the Wildlife Park will be a part of the new Cleland National Park. The executive director of the National Parks and Wildlife Service South Australia said that the decision was made of the collective conservation significance of both of the former conservation parks, with their ecologically significant flora and fauna. The draft management plan was developed in collaboration with technical specialists, Aboriginal representatives, park managers and other stakeholders, and is open to the public consultation for three months (25 October 2021 – 25 January 2022). The Wildlife Park requires different management from the rest of the park due to the number of visitors, needing to be managed as a commercial zone. The draft plan also includes possible tourist accommodation areas, on land currently within the Wildlife Park, but away from the animal enclosures.

Location and description
The conservation park occupies land in the gazetted suburbs of Cleland, Crafers and Waterfall Gully.

By far the largest part of the park consists of bushland, mostly woodland with some open spaces where clearing has taken place.

There are a number of walking trails, including the Waterfall Gully – Mount Lofty summit trail, a popular and fairly challenging ascent of the west side of Mount Lofty, and parts of the long distance Heysen and Yurrebilla Trails, which run north–south along the higher ground in the east of the park.

From December 2012, many trails in the park became shared-use, allowing mountain bikers to also make use of the trails.

Legislation and management
All the reserves and parks in South Australia are proclaimed under the National Parks and Wildlife Act 1972 (NPW Act) and the Wilderness Protection Act 1992 (the WP Act). Conservation of reserves are committed to the Minister under the Crown Land Management Act 2009. The NPW Act provides for the establishment and administration of reserves for conservation of wildlife in a natural environment, public benefit and pleasure and for other purposes.

The Hills and Fleurieu Landscape Board, which replaced the Natural Resources Adelaide and Mt Lofty Ranges (AMLR) in November 2020, is responsible for managing the natural assets of Adelaide Hills and Fleurieu Peninsula regions.

Cleland was formerly maintained by the South Australian Department for Environment & Water, and before that its predecessor, the Department for Water & Natural Resources.

Cleland Wildlife Park

Cleland Wildlife Park is managed separately from the national park,  as a major tourist destination since 1967 and  attracting around 100,000 tourists every year. It is a member of the South Australian Tourism Hall of Fame, having won the "Significant Tourism Attraction" category in 2007, 2008 and 2009 at the South Australian Tourism Awards, and in 2021 won the Silver Award for South Australia's best tourist attraction.

The park allows visitors to get close to the native animals in their natural environment, and offers a number of experiences such as being photographed while holding a koala, interacting with reptiles every day of the week, observing and listening to the keepers at feeding times, meeting an short-beaked echidna, various guided day and night walks and children's experiences. Wandering around the enclosures, some of the animals are able to be patted, such as the kangaroos (red and western grey) and swamp wallabies. Other animals at the park include Tasmanian devils, southern hairy-nosed wombats, western pygmy possums, bilbies, yellow-footed rock wallabies, dingoes and many native birds, and reptiles including snakes and goannas.

It is accessible by sealed road from both the South Eastern Freeway and Greenhill Road, and on foot on a formed but steep track from Waterfall Gully or Mount Lofty. A limited public bus service operates.

Other locations

Mount Lofty summit

It provides sweeping vistas across the Adelaide Plains and Gulf St Vincent. Flinders Column, a white painted obelisk shaped like a lighthouse, is a landmark which can be seen from far away on a clear day. Car parking facilities are provided: charges are payable. Public bus route 823 serves the summit with three journeys a day (including weekends and most holidays). Other facilities include an information centre/ souvenir shop, a cafe/restaurant (closed Mondays) and public toilets.

Waterfall Gully

Waterfall Gully, another popular part of the park, is located on its western edge. It can be accessed via the sealed Waterfall Gully Road. The main attraction is a waterfall, the largest of several in the park. The base is a short walk from the car park and the top can be reached by a formed but steep footpath, which continues to Cleland Wildlife Park and Mount Lofty summit.

See also
List of protected areas in Adelaide
Cleland (disambiguation)

References

Further reading

External links

Protected Planet

Protected areas in Adelaide
Wildlife sanctuaries of Australia
1945 establishments in Australia
Protected areas established in 1945
Wildlife parks in Australia
2021 establishments in Australia
Protected areas established in 2021
National parks of South Australia